The Aberdeen Act of 1845 was an Act of the Parliament of the United Kingdom (citation 8 & 9 Vict c. 122) passed during the reign Queen Victoria on 9 August. The long title of the Act is "An Act to amend an Act, intituled An Act to carry into execution a Convention between His Majesty and the Emperor of Brazil, for the Regulation and final Abolition of the African Slave Trade".

This law is seen in Brazilian historiography as a British retaliation against the Alves Branco law, a tariff reform established in 1844 by Finance Minister Manuel Alves Branco that raised import duties followed by the ending of the British-Brazilian Convention of 1826 on the Atlantic slave trade to Brazil.

History 
The Act was proposed by British Foreign Secretary Lord Aberdeen. It gave the Royal Navy authority to stop and search any Brazilian ship suspected of being a slave ship on the high seas, and to arrest slave traders caught on these ships.

The Act stipulated that arrested slave traders could be tried in British courts. The law was designed to suppress the Brazilian slave trade, to make effective Brazilian laws and the British-Brazilian Treaty of 1826 to end the Atlantic slave trade, that Brazil had signed and ratified but failed to enforce.

It provoked outrage in Brazil, where it was seen as a violation of free market, freedom of navigation, as an affront to Brazilian sovereignty and territorial integrity, and as an attempt to check Brazil's rise as a world power.

Controversies 
As a result, the Royal Navy began intercepting Brazilian slavers on the high seas, and Brazilian slave traders caught on these ships were prosecuted in British admiralty courts. Over the following years, the number of cases in British admiralty courts increased dramatically due to the large number of Brazilians arrested for slave-trading - in the first six months of 1848, 19 out of 33 cases heard by the vice admiralty court in St. Helena were Brazilian.

Despite the aggressive application of this law, the volume of the Brazilian slave trade increased in the late 1840s; the demand for slaves had increased due to British free-trade legislation that lifted tariffs on Brazilian sugar. However, Anglo-Brazilian tensions continued to increase. In 1850-51, a handful of British ships began entering Brazilian territorial waters and even its harbors to attack slave ships. In one instance, a British ship exchanged fire with a Brazilian fort.

In the face of these tensions, Brazil knew that it could not afford to go to war with Britain. In addition, popular sentiment against the slave trade in Brazil was growing. The Brazilian government decided to put an end to the slave trade. In September 1850, new legislation outlawing the slave trade was enacted, and the Brazilian government began to enforce it.

As a result, the Brazilian slave trade declined, and despite some illegal slavers that continued to operate, the trade came to an end in the mid-1850s, although slavery itself was not abolished in Brazil until 1888. On 27 April 1852, the British government notified its counterpart in Brazil of its permanent withdrawal of warships from Brazilian waters, on condition that there be no resumption of the slave trade; the reports of the British minister to Brazil in 1860 and the following year, showed no indication of breach. Finally satisfied there would be no resumption of the African slave trade, the British parliament repealed the Aberdeen Act on 19 April 1869.

See also
Pax Britannica
Slave Trade Act

References

Further reading
 Bethell, Leslie. The Abolition of the Brazilian Slave Trade: Britain, Brazil and the Slave Trade. Cambridge University Press, 1970. Chapters 9 to 12.

External links
 Text of Act

United Kingdom Acts of Parliament 1845
1845 in British law
Slave trade legislation